The little bronze cuckoo (Chrysococcyx minutillus) is a species of cuckoo in the family Cuculidae. It is found in Southeast Asia, New Guinea and northern and eastern Australia, where its natural habitat is subtropical or tropical moist lowland forest. The subspecies rufomerus and crassirostris are sometimes given specific status.

Subspecies
Subspecies accepted by the International Ornithologists' Union as of 2014 are:

C. m. peninsularis S.A.Parker, 1981 – southern Thailand and the Malay Peninsula
C. m. albifrons (Junge, 1938) – Sumatra and western Java
C. m. aheneus (Junge, 1938) – Borneo and the southern Philippines
C. m. jungei (Stresemann, 1938) – Sulawesi, Flores and Madu Island
C. m. rufomerus Hartert, 1900 (green-cheeked bronze cuckoo) – Lesser Sunda Islands
C. m. crassirostris (Salvadori, 1878) (pied bronze cuckoo) – considered by some authorities as a separate species. Found on Babar, Kai and Tanimbar Islands
C. m. salvadorii (Hartert & Stresemann, 1925) – Babar Islands
C. m. misoriensis (Salvadori, 1876) – Biak (Schouten Islands)
C. m. poecilurus G.R.Gray, 1862 – coastal New Guinea and northern Queensland
C. m. minutillus Gould, 1859 – northern Australia
C. m. barnardi Mathews, 1912 – eastern Australia
C. m. russatus Gould, 1868 – (Gould's bronze cuckoo) - formerly considered by some authorities as a separate species. Found in north-eastern Australia, New Guinea

References

External links 
 ABID Images
 On the HBW Internet Bird Collection

little bronze cuckoo
Birds of Southeast Asia
Birds of New Guinea
Birds of the Northern Territory
Birds of Queensland
little bronze cuckoo
Taxonomy articles created by Polbot
Taxobox binomials not recognized by IUCN